Panopsis is a genus of trees in the family Proteaceae. The species, which occur in Central and South America, include: Newer species that can be considered part of the Panopsis genus has been discovered recently, called Panopsis magnifruta. Common areas where Panopsis species are seen to grow in are described to have elevated groundwater levels.

Panopsis magnifruta
Panopsis cinnamomea  Pittier
Panopsis mucronata Cuatrec.
Panopsis multiflora (Schott ex Spreng.) Ducke
Panopsis parimensis Steyerm.
Panopsis pearcei Rusby
Panopsis polystachya (Kunth) Kuntze
Panopsis ptariana Steyerm.
Panopsis rubescens (Pohl) Pittier
Panopsis sessilifolia (Rich.) Sandwith
Panopsis suaveolens (Klotzsch) Pittier
Panopsis tepuiana Steyerm.
Panopsis yolombo (Pos.-Arang.) Killip

References

Proteaceae
Proteaceae genera
Neotropical realm flora